Diaphragmatic surface can refer to:

 Diaphragmatic surface of heart
 Diaphragmatic surface of liver
 Diaphragmatic surface of lung
 Diaphragmatic surface of spleen